SS Heidberg was a cargo steamship that was built in 1943 in Sweden for a German shipping company. The Allies in 1945 took it for war reparations. She was renamed Empire Convention, and spent about nine months under United Kingdom ownership and management. In 1946 she was transferred to the Soviet Union, who renamed her Эрнст Те́льман – Ernst Thaelmann. Her fate is not recorded.

Building
 built Heidberg in Helsingborg, and launched her on 6 March 1943.

She had a single screw, driven by a Helsingborgs Varfs three-cylinder triple expansion engine. Steam from its low-pressure cylinder drove an exhaust steam turbine, which powered a compressor. The compressor increased the pressure of steam exhausted from the high-pressure cylinder before it entered the intermediate-pressure cylinder. The pressure also increased the temperature of the steam. This reduced condensation in the intermediate- and low-pressure cylinders, increasing the engine's fuel efficiency and power.

Heidberg and Empire Convention
After the German surrender in 1945, Allied forces seized her at Szczecin.

The UK Ministry of War Transport took her over, renamed her Empire Convention, and registered her in London. Her UK official number 180342 and her call sign was GMFM. The MoWT appointed Ellerman's Wilson Line to manage her.

Ernst Thaelmann
Empire Convention was one of a number of ships that the UK transferred to the Soviet Union in February 1946 under the Potsdam Agreement. The Soviet Union renamed her after Ernst Thälmann, who had led the Communist Party of Germany until 1933, and had been executed in Buchenwald concentration camp in 1944.

Ernst Thaelmann became part of the Sakhalin Shipping Company fleet in the Soviet Far East. Lloyd's Register still recorded the ship as extant in 1959. She was deleted from international shipping registers in 1970.

References

Bibliography

1943 ships
Empire ships
Germany–Soviet Union relations
Merchant ships of the Soviet Union
Merchant ships of the United Kingdom
Ministry of War Transport ships
Ships built in Sweden
Soviet Union–United Kingdom relations
Steamships of Germany
Steamships of the Soviet Union
Steamships of the United Kingdom
World War II merchant ships of Germany